Patricia D. Richards (born 1947) is an American photographer.

Her work is included in the collection of the Museum of Fine Arts Houston, the Harry Ransom Center at the University of Texas Austin, and the Amon Carter Museum of American Art.

References

Living people
1947 births
20th-century American photographers
21st-century American photographers
20th-century American women artists
21st-century American women artists